is a passenger railway station located in the city of Koshigaya, Saitama, Japan, operated by the private railway operator Tōbu Railway.

Line
The station is served by the Tōbu Skytree Line (Tōbu Isesaki Line), and is 28.5 kilometers from the terminus of the line at Asakusa Station.

Station layout
The station has two opposed side platforms with two tracks, with an elevated station building above the tracks and platforms at a right angle.

Platforms

Adjacent stations

History
Ōbukuro Station opened on 1 October 1926. From 17 March 2012, station numbering was introduced on all Tōbu lines, with Ōbukuro Station becoming "TS-23".

Passenger statistics
In fiscal 2019, the station was used by an average of 18,687 passengers daily.

Surrounding area
 Koshigaya Ōbukuro Post Office

See also
 List of railway stations in Japan

References

External links

 Station information 

Railway stations in Japan opened in 1926
Tobu Skytree Line
Stations of Tobu Railway
Railway stations in Saitama Prefecture
Koshigaya, Saitama